Homaloptera ogilviei is a species of ray-finned fish in the genus Homaloptera found in Malaysia and western Borneo.

References

Fish of Thailand
Homaloptera
Fish described in 1967